John Charles Sexton (13 August 1925 – 4 March 2014) was an Australian rules footballer who played with North Melbourne in the Victorian Football League (VFL).

World War II
Sexton enlisted to serve in the Royal Australian Air Force in World War II, just after his eighteenth birthday, and served until March 1946.

Football
Sexton played four games for North Melbourne in the 1946 VFL season, being 20th man in the first two rounds of the season and then playing two games on the wing later in the season.

In 1947 Sexton transferred to Port Melbourne in the Victorian Football Association where he won a premiership in his first year and was a regular player for three seasons.

Notes

External links 

Jack Sexton's playing statistics from The VFA Project

1925 births
2014 deaths
Australian rules footballers from Melbourne
North Melbourne Football Club players
Port Melbourne Football Club players
People from Kensington, Victoria